Carl Williams (November 11, 1959 – April 7, 2013), nicknamed "The Truth", was an American boxer who competed as a professional from 1982 to 1997. He challenged twice for heavyweight world titles; the IBF title against Larry Holmes in 1985; and the undisputed title against Mike Tyson in 1989. At regional level he held the USBA heavyweight title from 1987 to 1991.

Early years 

Williams spent his childhood in South Jamaica, Queens. He was raised by his grandmother. After his grandmother died, Williams began to box at the age of nineteen, training with the Daniel M. O'Connell Park Gym in Saint Albans, New York (also known as the New York City Recreations O'Connell Center,) walking six miles to his gym and back each day, and showing a natural talent and determination. "He's a natural, no question about that," said his trainer, Vic Hanson.

Amateur career 
With a couple of amateur fights under his belt Williams won two New York Golden Gloves Championships. Williams won both the 1980 New York Golden Gloves Sub-Novice Heavyweight Championship and the 1981 Heavyweight Open Championship.

Highlights
Williams stopped (RSC 2) John Kibelka of the New York City Recreation in the finals of the 1980 Sub-Novice Heavyweight Championship.
Three knockouts and one decision propelled Williams into the 1981 Golden Gloves. In 1981 Williams stopped (RSC-2) Ronald Turner of the 25th Precinct in the heavyweight finals of the 55th New York Golden Gloves at 2:08.
Williams won the heavyweight Intercity Golden Gloves over Craig Bodzianowski of Chicago, April 27, 1981 at the Madison Square Garden. "punching like a cruise missile," in words of sports writer Tom Hanrahan
At that time he wanted to fight the '81 open champ, Mitch Green from Bronx, who has since turned pro.

His other notable achievements include:
 at the North American Championships (201 lbs), Shreveport, Louisiana, September 1981:
1/2: Defeated Patrick Fennel (Canada) RSC 3 
Finals: Defeated Roberto Gomez (Cuba)
 at the Boxing World Cup (201 lbs), Montreal, Canada, November 1981:
1/2: Defeated Nam Hee Kim (South Korea) KO 1
Finals: Defeated Alexander Yagubkin (Soviet Union) by unanimous decision, 5–0

Williams finished his amateur career with 22 fights, completing a record of 21–1.

Professional career 
Williams soon turned pro, signing a contract with Ron Katz of the Top Rank. After the initial successes he moved to a suburban motel in White Plains, New York, in order to concentrate on training, and stay away from big-city temptations. He was trained by Carmen Graziano.

Williams' first title shot was against Larry Holmes, a fight he lost in a controversial decision. His next fight was a victory against Jesse Ferguson. He then suffered a devastating knockout loss to Mike Weaver, which took him sixteen months to regain his shape and get back to the ring.

Williams is perhaps best known for having fought and lost to Mike Tyson (whom he first faced in sparring sessions, August 1, 1983, six years before the title fight, while Tyson was a 17-years-old amateur and Williams was 23 years old with a professional record 11-0) in a battle for the undisputed heavyweight championship. The first round knockout loss to Tyson in 1989 was a devastating defeat for Williams. Midway through the round, Tyson slipped a jab from Williams and loaded up with one of the most devastating counter-punches of his career, smashing Williams and sending him down for an eight count. The referee waved off the fight and Williams immediately launched a mild protest to the official and ringside judges but to no avail. He believed that the fight was stopped too early and he was not given more of an opportunity to demonstrate to the official that he was not disoriented after the knock-down. In a post fight in-ring interview, Williams appeared to be uninjured, spoke clearly, and expressed his disappointment that he was not given the opportunity to "show my stuff."  Williams also called for a rematch, however this never occurred.

After the defeat by Tyson, Williams became a journeyman heavyweight.  His other notable fights include losses to Larry Holmes, Tim Witherspoon, Tommy Morrison, and Frank Bruno, and wins against Bert Cooper and Trevor Berbick.

Williams retired in 1997 with a professional record of 30-10-0-1 with 21 knockouts.

After retirement
Williams worked for Allied-SpectaGuard in New York City at the World Trade Center as a security agent and field supervisor. After the September 11 attacks, Williams worked for Verizon in Queens, New York, as a security guard. Later he worked for Forte Security Group in New York City, as a security guard at the Copacabana and Marquee nightclubs until he became ill.

Death 
Williams died on April 7, 2013, of esophageal cancer. He was survived by a daughter, Carla, and a son, Daniel. He was predeceased by his 12-year-old daughter Nijah, who died of leukemia.

References in popular culture 
Williams was the inspiration for a parody character on the Fox program In Living Color, Carl "The Tooth" Williams, portrayed by Jamie Foxx, a boxer so named because he only had one tooth.  Williams would live his everyday life in his boxing apparel, making all appearances while singing the opening line to "Nuthin' But a 'G' Thang."

Professional boxing record

|-

References

External links
 

1959 births
2013 deaths
People from Belle Glade, Florida
American male boxers
Heavyweight boxers